Karlstrup Landsby is a small village in the municipality of Solrød. The village is approximately 3 km from the beach, Karlstrup Strand, situated in the middle of Køge Bugt (The Bay of Køge). There is a lake nearby, Karlstrup Kalkgrav, which used to be a chalk pit. The Danish national bicycle route #9 passes through Karlstrup Village.
Karlstrup is approximately 30 km from the capital of Denmark, Copenhagen.

References

Villages in Denmark
Solrød Municipality